Julia X is a 2011 American 3D comedy horror film starring Valerie Azlynn, Kevin Sorbo, Alicia Leigh Willis, Joel David Moore and Ving Rhames.

Cast

References

External links
 
 

2011 films
American 3D films
American comedy horror films
2011 3D films
2011 comedy horror films
2011 comedy films
2010s English-language films
2010s American films
English-language comedy horror films